William Alfred Shalders (12 February 1880 – 19 March 1917) was a Cape Colony cricketer who played in 12 Tests from 1899 to 1907.

Early life
Shalders was born in Kimberley, where his parents, John and Emily Shalders, owned the Halfway House inn from 1884 to 1925. He attended Kimberley Boys' High School.

Cricket career
He was a stroke-playing opening batsman whose impetuosity often led to his dismissal in the twenties or thirties. His highest Test score was 42 in his second Test, when South Africa took a first-innings lead of 65 over Australia only to lose by 159 runs. He made a valuable 38 when South Africa beat England by one wicket in the 1905-06 series.

He toured England with the South African team in 1901, 1904 and 1907, playing 58 of his 88 first-class matches in England and scoring his two first-class centuries. In 1901 he was the South Africans' second-highest run-scorer, with 782 runs at an average of 30.07, with a top score of 103 against Somerset. In 1907 he scored 105 against Hampshire. His highest first-class score in South Africa was 93, the highest score of the match, in an innings victory for Transvaal over Natal in 1903–04.

He was also a fine fieldsman and useful bowler.

Life outside cricket
He was a member of the Kimberley Town Guard during the Siege of Kimberley (October 1899 to February 1900) and was awarded the Queen's South Africa Medal and the Kimberley Star. He also served in World War I.

He was married to Myra Shalders. He died on 19 March 1917 at Cradock, Eastern Cape, and is buried in the Cradock cemetery.

References

External links

1880 births
1917 deaths
Cricketers from Kimberley, Northern Cape
Cricketers from Cape Colony
Gauteng cricketers
Griqualand West cricketers
London County cricketers
South African military personnel of World War I